General Raymond Edward Johns Jr. (born December 7, 1954) is a retired United States Air Force officer who served as Commander, Air Mobility Command.

Military career
Johns graduated from the United States Air Force Academy in 1977. His aviation career includes Northrop T-38 Talon and Lockheed C-141 Starlifter instructor pilot, as well as the chief test pilot and test program manager for the Boeing VC-25 Air Force One Replacement Program. He was chosen as a White House Fellow in 1991 where he was a senior staff member in the Office of National Service. The general has served at Headquarters United States European Command in security assistance and congressional affairs, and at Headquarters United States Pacific Command as Deputy Director of Strategic Plans and Policy. Within Headquarters United States Air Force, he served as Deputy Director and, later, Director of Air Force Programs. The general commanded a test squadron, operations group and airlift wing, and he was the Director of Mobility Forces for operations in Bosnia.

Johns served as the Air Force's Deputy Chief of Staff for Strategic Plans and Programs from October 2006 to November 16, 2009. Johns led Air Mobility Command's mission to provide rapid, global mobility and sustainment for America's armed forces. The command also plays a crucial role in providing humanitarian support at home and around the world. The men and women of AMC – active duty, Air National Guard, Air Force Reserve and civilians – provide airlift, aerial refueling, special air mission and aeromedical evacuation. Johns retired with an effective date of January 1, 2013. He currently serves as the Senior Vice President for Government Business, Flight Safety International at the National Commission on the Structure of the Air Force.

Johns is a command pilot and experimental test pilot with 4,500 flying hours in a variety of aircraft.

Education
Johns grew up in Washington Township, Bergen County, New Jersey and attended Westwood Regional High School.

In 1977, Johns earned a Bachelor of Science in aeronautical engineering from the United States Air Force Academy in Colorado Springs, Colorado. He graduated from Squadron Officer School, Maxwell AFB, Alabama in 1982. In 1988, he completed a Master of Science in Administration from Central Michigan University. He has also received education and training at the Air Command and Staff College; the U.S. Air Force Test Pilot School at Edwards AFB in California; the Defense Systems Management College; the Industrial College of the Armed Forces at Fort Lesley J. McNair in Washington, D.C.; the National Security Management Course at Syracuse University; and the Program for Senior Executives in National and International Security Management at Harvard University's John F. Kennedy School of Government.

Assignments
 June 1977 – February 1979, student, undergraduate pilot training, Williams AFB, Ariz.
 February 1979 – June 1982, T-38 instructor pilot, academic instructor, class commander and assistant wing executive officer, Williams AFB, Ariz.
 June 1982 – August 1984, squadron executive officer, McGuire AFB, N.J.
 August 1984 – June 1985, Air Staff Training Program officer, Air Force Issues Team, Office of the Vice Chief of Staff, Headquarters U.S. Air Force, Washington, D.C.
 June 1985 – June 1986, student, U.S. Air Force Test Pilot School, Edwards AFB, Calif.
 June 1985 – May 1990, N/K/C-135A/E experimental test pilot/Air Force One, Wright-Patterson AFB, Ohio
 May 1990 – August 1991, Commander, 4953d Test Squadron, C-141, T-39, T-37 and Commercial Aircraft Derivative Testing, Wright-Patterson AFB, Ohio
 August 1991 – August 1992, White House Fellow, Office of National Service and National Security Council, Washington, D.C.
 August 1992 – June 1993, student, Industrial College of the Armed Forces, Fort Lesley J. McNair, Washington, D.C.
 July 1993 – June 1994, Chief of Security Assistance, Plans, Policy and Training Branch, Logistics and Security Assistance Directorate, Headquarters U.S. European Command, Stuttgart, Germany
 June 1994 – July 1995, Chief of Strategy, Congressional and Resources, Plans and Policy Directorate, Headquarters U.S. European Command, Stuttgart, Germany (November 1994 – January 1995, U.S. Lead, United Nations Peacekeeping Mission in Liberia)
 July 1995 – June 1996, Senior Director, Tanker Airlift Control Center, Scott AFB, Ill.
 June 1996 – August 1998, Commander, 60th Operations Group, Travis AFB, Calif. (October 1996 – January 1997, Director of Mobility Forces, Operation Joint Endeavor, Bosnia)
 August 1998 – July 2000, Commander, 62d Airlift Wing, McChord AFB, Wash.
 July 2000 – August 2002, Deputy Director, Strategic Plans and Policy, Headquarters U.S. Pacific Command, Camp H.M. Smith, Hawaii
 August 2002 – July 2004, Deputy Director of Programs, Office of the Deputy Chief of Staff for Plans and Programs, Headquarters U.S. Air Force, Washington, D.C.
 August 2004 – October 2006, Director of Programs, Office of the Deputy Chief of Staff for Strategic Plans and Programs, Headquarters U.S. Air Force, Washington, D.C.
 October 2006 – November 2009, Deputy Chief of Staff for Strategic Plans and Programs, Headquarters U.S. Air Force, Washington, D.C.
 November 2009 – November 2012, Commander, Air Mobility Command, Scott AFB, Ill.

Flight information
Johns is rated as a  Command pilot and experimental test pilot with 4,500 flight hours.  He has flown: C-17, C-141, T-38, VC-25 (Air Force One), N/K/C-135, KC-10 and C-5.

Major awards and decorations

Promotion dates

References

External links

1954 births
Living people
People from Washington Township, Bergen County, New Jersey
United States Air Force Academy alumni
Westwood Regional High School alumni
Central Michigan University alumni
United States Air Force generals
Recipients of the Air Force Distinguished Service Medal
Recipients of the Legion of Merit
Recipients of the Air Medal
Recipients of the Defense Superior Service Medal
White House Fellows
Recipients of the Meritorious Service Medal (United States)
Military personnel from New Jersey